Gerrhopilus oligolepis, also known as the few-scaled worm snake or Wall's worm snake, is a harmless blind snake species found in northern India and Nepal. No subspecies are currently recognized.

Geographic range
Found in the eastern Himalayas in India in the area of Sikkim and Darjeeling and in Nepal. The type locality given is "Nagri Valley below Darjeeling [India] at an altitude of about 5000 feet."

References

Further reading
 Wall F. 1909. Notes on snakes from the neighbourhood of Darjeeling. J. Bombay nat. Hist. Soc. 19:337-357.

oligolepis
Snakes of Asia
Reptiles of India
Reptiles of Nepal
Taxa named by Frank Wall
Reptiles described in 1909